Paul Gauguin (1848–1903) was a French artist.

Gauguin may also refer to:

People
Jean René Gauguin (1881–1961), French–Danish sculptor
Paul René Gauguin (1911–1976), Norwegian artist
Pola Gauguin (1883–1961), Danish–Norwegian artist

Other uses
Gauguin (crater), a crater on Mercury
10136 Gauguin, a minor planet
Paul Gauguin (ship)

See also